The Copa Libertadores is a seasonal association football competition that was established in 1960. It begins in mid-January and ends with the final in November of the same year. The Copa Libertadores is open to the league champions of CONMEBOL member associations; clubs finishing from second to fourth position in the stronger leagues of the region, such as the Brazilian league, are also included. Originally, only the champions of their respective national league could participate in the competition. However, in 1966 this was changed to allow the runners-up of the leagues to compete. Until 2018, the final was contested over two legs, one at each participating club's stadium. From 2019, the format was changed, with the final being a single game played at a pre-determined venue. 

The data below does not include the 1948 South American Championship of Champions, as it is not listed by CONMEBOL either as a Libertadores edition or an official competition. It must be pointed out, however, that at least in the years 1996 and 1997, CONMEBOL entitled equal status to both the Copa Libertadores and the 1948 tournament, in that the 1948 champions (Vasco da Gama) were allowed to participate in the Supercopa Libertadores, a CONMEBOL official competition that allowed participation for former Libertadores champions only (for example, not admitting participation for champions of other CONMEBOL official competitions, such as the Copa CONMEBOL).  

Independiente hold the record for the most victories, with seven wins since the competition's inception. They have also won the competition the most times consecutively, winning four in a row from 1972 to 1975. Boca Juniors are second with six wins; they won their last title in 2007. Peñarol are third with five wins, their most recent of which was in 1987. Boca Juniors and Peñarol have lost the most finals, having both lost on five occasions. Overall, 25 clubs have won the competition since its inception in 1960. Clubs from Argentina have won the most Copas Libertadores, with 25 titles among them. Brazilian clubs are second with 20 victories, and Uruguayan clubs are third with 8.

List of finals

 The "Year" column refers to the season the competition was held, and wikilinks to the article about that season.
 Finals are listed in the order they were played.

Performances

By club

By nation

See also
List of Copa Libertadores winning managers

Notes

References
General
 

Specific

External links
 Copa Libertadores history on Conmebol.com (archived)
 Copa Libertadores on the RSSSF

 
finals
Copa Libertadores